Sphinctanthus is a genus of flowering plants in the family Rubiaceae, native to tropical South America. It is in a clade with Rosenbergiodendron and Tocoyena.

Species
Currently accepted species include:

Sphinctanthus acutilobus Huber
Sphinctanthus aurantiacus (Standl.) Fagerl.
Sphinctanthus fluvii-dulcis Delprete & C.H.Perss.
Sphinctanthus hasslerianus Chodat
Sphinctanthus insignis Steyerm.
Sphinctanthus maculatus Spruce ex K.Schum.
Sphinctanthus microphyllus K.Schum.
Sphinctanthus polycarpus (H.Karst.) Hook.f.
Sphinctanthus striiflorus (DC.) Hook.f. ex K.Schum.

References

Rubiaceae genera
Gardenieae